Established in 1879, The Greeneville Sun is a daily newspaper in Greeneville, Tennessee.

Overview
The award-winning newspaper has a circulation of 14,390 for each of five weekday editions and 15,218 for the Saturday-Sunday edition.

The Sun also produces The Greeneville Neighbor News each Wednesday. With a circulation of 11,065, the free publication spotlights arts and entertainment in the East Tennessee region.

The Greeneville Sun is part of Greeneville Publishing Co., a division of Jones Media Inc. Jones Media was acquired by Adams Publishing Group in 2016.

Gregg K. Jones serves as publisher; John E. Cash, general manager; Michael S. Reneau, editor; Artie Wehenkel, advertising director; Dale Long, circulation director; and Brian Cutshall, online director.

References

External links
Greeneville TN News

Newspapers established in 1879
Newspapers published in Tennessee
1879 establishments in Tennessee